The  Comodoro Rivadavia rail disaster occurred on July 12, 1980, in the city of Comodoro Rivadavia in the Patagonian province of Chubut, Argentina. It happened in a region between stations Muelle YPF and Gamela in the General Mosconi neighborhood, popularly known as "Kilómetro 3".

The main cause of the accident was a brake failure that caused the railcar ran at a high speed from Colonia Sarmiento until it crashed another unit that had departed from Comodoro Rivadavia.

Overview 
The progressive deterioration of rolling stock due to lack of maintenance caused the Comodoro Rivadavia Railway (which belonged to Argentine State Railway) had obsolete vehicles by 1960. With the Plan Larkin (a general restructuring of Argentine transport made by engineer Thomas B. Larkin at a request of the government of Argentina leaded by Arturo Frondizi) that recommended the closure of improductive and non-profitable railway lines. the renovation of rolling stock was completely dismissed. As a result, the CRR was forced to continue using obsolete (and risky) material.

On July 12, 1960, at 19:00, a Ganz railcar that returned from Sarmiento cracked its brake system. As the emergency brake didn't work either, the tran started a headlong race towards Comodoro Rivadavia, helped by a downward gradient towards the city. Despite the desperate attempts of the train driver, it was impossible to stop the railcar, which crashed a Drewry unit departing from Comodoro Rivadavia towards Astra station. The impact was strong enough to pull both units almost 200 meters to Muelle YPF station. Most of the passengers were severely injured.

A total of 100 people (from both railcars) were involved in the accident, with 3 fatal victims, they were Marta Fernández, Osvaldo Barceló, and Agustín De Alba. The tragedy also had a huge amount of injured passengers, many of them became disabled. Few moments after the accident, hundreds of people reach out to help.

A cross made of rail tracks was placed on the site of the accident to commemorate the tragedy. On August 12, 2021, the municipality of Comodoro Rivadavia paid hommage to victims and their relatives placing a plaque that tells the unfortunate event.

See also 
 Comodoro Rivadavia rail disaster (1953)

References 

Railway accidents in 1960
Train collisions in Argentina
1960 in Argentina
1960 disasters in Argentina